Sir George Thomas, 3rd Baronet (c. 1740 – 6 May 1815), was a British politician.

Life
Thomas was the son of Sir William Thomas, 2nd Baronet, and he succeeded to his father's baronetcy in 1777.

In 1780 he create Dale Park near Madehurst by buying up separate pieces of land and joining them together into an estate. He married Sophia Montagu, daughter of Admiral John Montagu and Sophia Wroughton, on 20 December 1782. The lived in Madehurst Lodge during the 1780s whilst their new house was constructed by the architect Joseph Bonomi. The house is thought to have still been under construction in 1791.

He sat in the House of Commons of Great Britain as the Member of Parliament for Arundel between 1790 and 1797.

References

Baronets in the Baronetage of Great Britain
British MPs 1790–1796
British MPs 1796–1800
Members of the Parliament of Great Britain for English constituencies
1740s births
1815 deaths